Ed Corney (November 9, 1933 – January 1, 2019) was an American professional bodybuilder. He won many prizes in his 30s, including Mr. Universe twice (in 1971 and 1972), and Mr. America once (in 1972). He resumed competitive bodybuilding in his 60s, when he won the 60+ division of the Masters Olympia twice.

He appeared in the 1977 docudrama Pumping Iron, as well as the "Dead Lift" episode from The Streets of San Francisco broadcast that same year (in which Arnold Schwarzenegger played one of his first prominent roles).

Early life
Corney was born on November 9, 1933, in Honolulu, Hawaii. He graduated from Saint Louis School in 1952, and he served in the United States Coast Guard. He subsequently moved to San Jose, California, where he became "a full-time bar owner and bouncer."

Bodybuilding career
Corney took up bodybuilding at 27, and he first competed at the age of 35. He entered and won his first contest in 1967, the Mr. Fremont, held in the Bay Area. He wins the following year. He also won: Mr. Heart of California, Mr. Northern California and Mr. Golden West. He continued to climb the bodybuilding ladder with wins at the 1970 Iron Man, the 1971 AAU Mr. California, the 1971 IFBB Mr. USA, and the 1972 IFBB Mr. America. He also won the IFBB Mr. Universe twice: in New York City in 1971, and in Baghdad, Iraq in 1972. He also won the IFBB Mr. America in 1972, Mr. World in 1973, and Mr. World in 1974. Corney appeared in the 1977 movie Pumping Iron. He was also featured on the cover of its book version, Pumping Iron: The Art and Sport of Bodybuilding by Charles Gaines and George Butler.

Corney continued to compete in the 1980s. At the time, he admitted to using steroids, but he explained that training should be the bedrock of bodybuilding. He added that he was "97 percent training and three percent steroids." In 1994, Corney won the 60+ division of the Masters Olympia. He won again in 1995, he was placed 11th overall in 1996, and he took second in the 60+ division in 1997. He also competed in 1998 in the only Masters event ever to be held at the Arnold Schwarzenegger Classic. Corney remained active in the sport up until his death. He was inducted into the IFBB Hall of Fame in 2004.

Personal life and death
Corney resided in San Jose, California. In 1999, he suffered a heart attack while undergoing shoulder replacement surgery. A blood thinning medication that was given to him to treat the heart attack caused him to suffer two strokes. After a short period in a coma and some time using a wheelchair, Corney fought his way back to health.

Corney had a brain aneurysm on December 25, 2018, and died on January 1, 2019, at the age of 85 in Hughson, California. Shortly after his death, former California Governor Arnold Schwarzenegger tweeted, "Ed Corney was a jewel of a guy. He was one of the greatest posers bodybuilding has ever seen, and he was a fantastic training partner. He inspired me and I’ll miss him dearly. My thoughts are with his family."

Stats
 Height: 5' 7"
 Weight: 195 lbs

Wins
1968

Mr California - AAU, 5th
Mr Northern California - AAU, Winner

1969

Mr Western America - AAU, Winner

1970

Mr America - AAU, 11th
Mr California - AAU, Most Muscular, 2nd
Mr California - AAU, Did not place
Iron Man, Winner

1971

Mr America - AAU, 4th
Mr America - IFBB, Short, 1st
Mr California - AAU, Most Muscular, 1st
Mr California - AAU, Winner
Mr USA - IFBB, Short, 1st
Mr USA - IFBB, Overall Winner
Universe - IFBB, Medium, 3rd

1972

Mr America - IFBB, Short, 1st
Mr America - IFBB, Overall Winner
Mr International - IFBB, Short, 1st
Universe - IFBB, Medium, 1st
Universe - IFBB, Overall Winner

1973

Mr World - IFBB, Medium, 1st

1974

Mr International - IFBB, Short, 1st
Mr World - IFBB, Short, 1st

1975

1975 Mr. Olympia - IFBB, LightWeight, 2nd
Universe - Pro - IFBB, 2nd
World Pro Championships - IFBB, LightWeight, 2nd

1976

1976 Mr. Olympia - IFBB, LightWeight, 3rd

1977

1977 Mr. Olympia - IFBB, LightWeight, 2nd
1977 Mr. Olympia - IFBB, Overall, 3rd

1978

Night of Champions - IFBB, 4th
1978 Mr. Olympia - IFBB, LightWeight, 4th
1978 Mr. Olympia - IFBB, Overall, 7th

1979

Canada Pro Cup - IFBB, Did not place
Florida Pro Invitational - IFBB, 7th
Grand Prix Pennsylvania - IFBB, Did not place
Night of Champions - IFBB, 8th
1979 Mr. Olympia - IFBB, LightWeight, 9th
Pittsburgh Pro Invitational - IFBB, 8th
Universe - Pro - IFBB, 5th
World Pro Championships - IFBB, 5th

1980

Grand Prix Miami - IFBB, 6th
Grand Prix Pennsylvania - IFBB, 6th
Night of Champions - IFBB, 4th
1980 Mr. Olympia - IFBB, 11th
Pittsburgh Pro Invitational - IFBB, 6th
Universe - Pro - IFBB, Did not place
World Pro Championships - IFBB, Did not place

1981

1981 Mr. Olympia - IFBB, 13th

1983

1983 Mr. Olympia - IFBB, 14th

1989

Super Bowl of Bodybuilding - PBA, 4th

1994

Olympia - Masters - IFBB, Masters 60+, 1st
Olympia - Masters - IFBB, 10th

1995

Olympia - Masters - IFBB, Masters 60+, 1st
Olympia - Masters - IFBB, 11th

1996

Olympia - Masters - IFBB, 11th

1997

Olympia - Masters - IFBB, Masters 60+, 2nd

1998

Arnold Classic - IFBB, Masters, 10th

2004

IFBB Hall Of Fame

Further reading
 Kight, Pete.  (1978, February/March).  Ed Corney.  Muscle Digest.  2(1), pp. 50–52, 54.

See also
 List of male professional bodybuilders
 List of people from Hawaii

References

External links

1933 births
2019 deaths
Businesspeople from San Jose, California
American bodybuilders
Sportspeople from Honolulu
Military personnel from Hawaii
People associated with physical culture
Professional bodybuilders
United States Coast Guard enlisted
Deaths from intracranial aneurysm
Place of death missing
20th-century American businesspeople